Vezman (also Romanized as Vezmān, Vazmān, and Vozmān; also known as ‘Os̄mān and Usmān) is a village in Qaratureh Rural District, in the Central District of Divandarreh County, Kurdistan Province, Iran. At the 2006 census, its population was 937, in 184 families. The village is populated by Kurds.

References 

Towns and villages in Divandarreh County
Kurdish settlements in Kurdistan Province